The Dark Goddess is a novel by French American novelist Marvin H. Albert.

Plot introduction
Archaeologist Moira Rhalles is kidnapped by the KGB while she is on a dig in France.  
Her historian husband and her ex-boyfriend team up to try to rescue her.

Explanation of the novel's title
The title refers to the dark earth-mother goddess, of which a paleolithic statuette was made.

1978 American novels
American thriller novels
Novels set in France
Doubleday (publisher) books